Mi primer amor is a Mexican telenovela produced by Antulio Jiménez Pons for Televisa in 1973.

Plot 
Gerardo is a handsome teacher, a widower with four children, who arrives to Mexico City after a long time living away, to take over the management of a school. There María del Carmen, who has virtually taken over the school while awaiting the arrival of a new principal works. There also works as secretary Mauricio. Both are nervous about the arrival of new manager. However, the surprise of María del Carmen is capitalized when you discover that the director will be Gerardo, who was his childhood sweetheart and who has not seen a long time, until now. Gerardo is greeted kindly by Doña Julia, one of his old acquaintance who has two children: Hector and Elio.

Cast 
Raúl Ramírez as Gerardo
Sonia Furió as Paula
Ofelia Guilmáin as Doña Julia
María Douglas as Doña Virginia
Gregorio Casal as Héctor
Diana Bracho as Elena
Carlos Piñar as Rafael
Edith González as Lucía
Celia Manzano as Doña Mercedes
Rafael Baledón as Vicente
Nadia Milton as Claudia
Ana Martín as Baby
Fernando Borges as Rudy
Queta Lavat

References

External links 

Mexican telenovelas
1973 telenovelas
Televisa telenovelas
1973 Mexican television series debuts
1973 Mexican television series endings
Mexican television series based on Brazilian television series